The 2015 Poinsettia Bowl was a college football bowl game that was played on December 23, 2015 at Qualcomm Stadium in San Diego, California. Boise State Broncos from the Mountain West Conference defeated the Northern Illinois Huskies from the Mid-American Conference.  It was one of the 2015–16 bowl games that concluded the 2015 FBS football season. The game started at 1:30 p.m. PST and was televised on ESPN. Sponsored by San Diego County Credit Union, the game is officially known as the San Diego County Credit Union Poinsettia Bowl.

Team selection

The Boise State Broncos from the Mountain West Conference defeated the Northern Illinois Huskies from the Mid-American Conference.

Boise State

Following Boise State's regular season ending win over San Jose State, where they finished the 2015 regular season 8–4, 5–3 in West Division play to finish in a four way tie for 2nd place, the Poinsettia Bowl expressed their interest in inviting the Broncos. The  Las Vegas Bowl held the first selection from the Mountain West but also had an agreement to pick BYU in either 2015 or 2019. When Las Vegas chose to invite BYU, the Mountain West's first selection fell to the Poinsettia Bowl. The Poinsettia Bowl was not obligated to take the Mountain West Champions, San Diego State, and could choose any Mountain West team they wanted. They chose the Broncos, who made their second Poinsettia Bowl appearance and first appearance since 2008 where they lost to TCU 17–16 to end their undefeated season.

Northern Illinois

Had Army become bowl eligible, they would have been invited to the Poinsettia Bowl. When they failed to become bowl eligible, the selection fell to the Mid-American Conference. The Northern Illinois Huskies were selected to set up a match-up of two of the winningest programs since 2010. The Huskies finished the regular season 8–5, 6–2 in West Division play to finish in a four way tie for the division title. They represented the West Division in the MAC Championship Game where they lost to Bowling Green. It was the Huskies sixth consecutive MAC Championship Game appearance. It was the Huskies third Poinsettia Bowl appearance with losses in 2006 and 2013.

Game summary

Scoring Summary

Source:

Statistics

References

2015–16 NCAA football bowl games
2015
2015
2015
2015 in sports in California
December 2015 sports events in the United States
2010s in San Diego